Jerald Monye Sowell (born January 21, 1974) is a former American football fullback. He played ten seasons in the National Football League (NFL) with the New York Jets and Tampa Bay Buccaneers. He played college football at Tulane.

Playing career
He holds the record for the longest play in Tulane football history, breaking off a 98-yard run against the defending national champions Alabama in 1993. Although Tulane lost the game 31–17, Sowell recorded 138 rushing yards to become the first player to run for over 100 yards against Alabama since Florida's Errict Rhett in 1991.

Sowell was drafted with the 30th pick in the 7th round in the 1997 NFL Draft by the Green Bay Packers. However, he never played with the Packers as he was traded to the New York Jets in his rookie year. He did not have a standout season as a Jet until the 2003 season, in which he had 47 catches. Sowell then had two more good seasons with the Jets as a receiver catching 45 and 28 passes respectively. He has 135 career special team tackles which is a Jets record. Sowell was released by the Jets after the 2005 season. He then played one year for the Tampa Bay Buccaneers.

References

1974 births
American football fullbacks
Living people
Tulane Green Wave football players
New York Jets players
Tampa Bay Buccaneers players